Kyrylo Dryshlyuk (born 16 September 1999) is a Ukrainian professional football midfielder who plays for Oleksandriya in the Ukrainian Premier League.

Career
Dryshlyuk is a product of the FC Dynamo Kyiv Youth Sportive School System.

In summer 2016 he signed contract with the new promoted to the Ukrainian Premier League FC Zirka Kropyvnytskyi. Dryshlyuk made his debut for FC Zirka in the match against FC Stal Kamianske on 23 April 2017 in the Ukrainian Premier League.

Honours

International

Ukraine U20
FIFA U-20 World Cup: 2019

Personal life
His father, captain Pavlo Dryshlyuk (1973–2014) was killed during Russian-Ukrainian War in the Sloviansk Raion of the Donetsk Oblast.

References

External links

1999 births
Living people
People from Boryspil
Ukrainian footballers
Ukrainian expatriate footballers
FC Zirka Kropyvnytskyi players
FC Oleksandriya players
FK Spartaks Jūrmala players
Ukrainian Premier League players
Latvian Higher League players
Ukraine youth international footballers
Expatriate footballers in Latvia
Ukrainian expatriate sportspeople in Latvia
Association football midfielders
Sportspeople from Kyiv Oblast